is a railway station on the high-speed Joetsu Shinkansen in Minakami, Gunma, Japan, operated by the East Japan Railway Company (JR East).

Station layout
The elevated station has two side platforms serving two tracks. There are also two middle tracks for passing trains.

Platforms

History
The station opened on 15 November 1982.

Future plans
On 15 September 2022, a formal petition was made to JR East to change the name of the station to include the name . Proponents for the name change proposal state that the current name does not accurately describe the area in which the station is located. The campaign included the submission of 15,000 signatures.

Passenger statistics
In fiscal 2006, the station was used by an average of 732 passengers daily (boarding passengers only).

Bus services

Highway Buses
Kan-etsu Kotsu Bus
 "Minakami Onsen Line"
For Shinjuku Station via Kawagoe Station

Route buses
Kan-etsu Kotsu Bus
For Minakami Station and Tanigawadake Ropeway via Kamimoku Station
For Numata Station, Kamata and Oze-Tokura via Gokan Station

Surrounding area

The station is located nearby Sarugakyō Mikuni Onsen, Kamimoku Onsen, Namesawa Onsen and Oigami Onsen.

See also
 List of railway stations in Japan

References

External links

Jōmō-Kōgen Station - JR East 

Railway stations in Gunma Prefecture
Railway stations in Japan opened in 1982
Stations of East Japan Railway Company